Kayin State Government is the cabinet of Kayin State. The cabinet is led by chief minister, Nang Khin Htwe Myint.

Cabinet (April 2016–present)

See also 
State and Region Government of Myanmar

References 
http://www.president-office.gov.mm/?q=cabinet/region-and-state-government/id-10190

State and region governments of Myanmar
Kayin State